The D.A. Varnado and Son Store in Franklinton, Louisiana is an Italianate-style building constructed in c.1900.  It was listed on the National Register of Historic Places in 2001.

It was deemed to be "locally significant in the area of architecture because it is a rare and well preserved historic commercial building with period shopfront and interior."

It is a two-story brick commercial building.  It originally had a second-story gallery wrapping around three sides of the building;  this was removed in a 1925 renovation and replaced by a metal awning.

References

Commercial buildings on the National Register of Historic Places in Louisiana
Italianate architecture in Louisiana
Commercial buildings completed in 1900
Washington Parish, Louisiana